Princess Fragrant is a Chinese 3-D cartoon series directed by Deng Jianglei and produced by the Shenzhen Qianheng Cultural Communication Company. Its basis is the Fragrant Concubine, a Chinese legend about a Uighur girl from Kashgar who became a concubine of the Qianlong Emperor. The cartoon was produced to improve relations between the Han Chinese and the Uighurs. The series, which will be available in the Mandarin and Uighur languages, is scheduled to have 104 episodes. It will begin airing in 2015.

The main characters are Ipal Khan and Tuerdo.

The producing company had spent $3 million U.S. dollars to create the series.

References

External links
 Princess Fragrant on Youku
  "美媒：中国推香妃动画片 意图促进维汉民族和睦" (Archive). QQ News. 2014-08-28.
  "“天香公主”促进维汉团结？" (Archive). Deutsche Welle. 27.08.2014
  "內地播3D動畫《天香公主》團結新疆民族" (Archive). TVB News. 28.08.2014.
  "香妃变身新中国天香公主救场新疆维稳" (Archive). DWNews.com. Chinese Media Net, Inc., 2014-08-28.

2014 Chinese television series debuts
Chinese children's animated television series